Klaus Bühler (16 January 1941 – 3 February 2021) was a German politician of the Christian Democratic Union (CDU) who served as member of the German Bundestag.

Life 
After elementary school, Buhler attended the humanistic grammar school in Bruchsal. This was followed by teacher training in Heidelberg and Karlsruhe. In 1965 he became district chairman of the Junge Union in the district of Bruchsal, which he remained for ten years. From 1968 to 1976 he was a member of the Bruchsal municipal council. From 1971 to 1976 he was also a member of the Bruchsal district council and Karlsruhe district council respectively. He worked as a secondary school teacher until 1974, after which he became head of the Heidelberg branch office for the Karlsruhe administrative district of the Landeszentrale für politische Bildung.

In 1976 he was elected to the Bundestag for the first time and returned to parliament in the following legislative periods. Since 1987 he was the representative of the Federal Republic of Germany in the Parliamentary Assembly of the Council of Europe and at the same time representative in the Assembly of the Western European Union. In 2002 he resigned from the Bundestag.

He died eighteen days after his 80th birthday.

References 

1941 births
2021 deaths
Members of the Bundestag for Baden-Württemberg
Members of the Bundestag 1998–2002
Members of the Bundestag 1994–1998
Members of the Bundestag 1990–1994
Members of the Bundestag 1987–1990
Members of the Bundestag 1983–1987
Members of the Bundestag 1980–1983
Members of the Bundestag 1976–1980
Members of the Bundestag for the Christian Democratic Union of Germany
People from Göttingen (district)